Cosmic Assault is the ninth album by Helios Creed, released on July 18, 1995, through Cleopatra Records.

Track listing

Personnel 
Musicians
Helios Creed – vocals, guitar, bass guitar, synthesizer, sampler, mixing, production
Chris McKay – bass guitar
Paul Della Pelle – drums
Z Sylver – synthesizer, sampler
Production and additional personnel
Judson Leach – mastering

References 

1995 albums
Cleopatra Records albums
Helios Creed albums